The 2006 Ordina Open was the 2006 edition of the Ordina Open tennis tournament. It was the 17th edition of the tournament and was played on outdoor grass courts in Rosmalen, 's-Hertogenbosch Netherlands. The men's and women's tournament was held from 18 June until 24 June 2006. Mario Ančić and Michaëlla Krajicek won the singles titles.

Finals

Men's singles

 Mario Ančić defeated  Jan Hernych 6–0, 5–7, 7–5

Women's singles

 Michaëlla Krajicek defeated  Dinara Safina 6–3, 6–4

Men's doubles

 Martin Damm /  Leander Paes defeated  Arnaud Clément /  Chris Haggard 6–1, 7–6

Women's doubles

 Yan Zi /  Zheng Jie defeated  Ana Ivanovic /  Maria Kirilenko 3–6, 6–2, 6–2

References

External links
 
 Men's Singles draw
 Men's Doubles draw
 Men's Qualifying Singles draw

Ordina Open
Ordina Open
Rosmalen Grass Court Championships
2006 in Dutch tennis